Frunză is a commune in the Slobozia District of Transnistria, Moldova. It is composed of seven villages: Andriașevca Nouă, Andriașevca Veche, Frunză, Novocotovsc, Priozernoe, Uiutnoe and Novosavițcaia station. It has since 1990 been administered as a part of the breakaway Transnistrian Moldovan Republic.

References

Communes of Transnistria
Slobozia District